Gidwitz is a surname. Notable people with the surname include:

Adam Gidwitz (born 1982), American children's book author 
Gerald Gidwitz (1906–2006), American businessman 
Ronald Gidwitz (born 1945), American businessman and diplomat